The 1944 Arkansas gubernatorial election was held on November 7, 1944.

Incumbent Democratic Governor Homer Martin Adkins did not seek a third term, instead running unsuccessfully for the U.S. Senate.

Democratic nominee Benjamin Travis Laney defeated Republican nominee Harley C. Stump with 85.96% of the vote.

Democratic primary

The Democratic primary election was held on July 25, 1944, with the Democratic runoff scheduled for August 8, 1944 if no candidate won over 50% of the vote.

Candidates
Benjamin Travis Laney, businessman and former mayor of Camden
J. Bryan Sims, former State Comptroller
David D. Terry, former U.S. Representative

Results

Sims withdrew from a runoff, and Laney became the Democratic nominee.

General election

Candidates
Benjamin Travis Laney, Democratic
Harley C. Stump, Republican, Mayor of Stuttgart and candidate for Governor in 1940

Results

References

Bibliography
 
 

1944
Arkansas
Gubernatorial
November 1944 events